"Woman" is a song written and performed by English singer, songwriter, musician and peace activist John Lennon from his 1980 album Double Fantasy. The track was chosen by Lennon to be the second single released from the Double Fantasy album, and it was the first Lennon single issued after his murder on 8 December 1980. The B-side of the single is Ono's song "Beautiful Boys".

Lennon wrote "Woman" as an ode to his wife Yoko Ono, and to all women. The track begins with Lennon whispering, "For the other half of the sky", a paraphrase of a Chinese proverb, once used by Mao Zedong.

Background
In an interview for Rolling Stone magazine on 5 December 1980, three days before his murder, John Lennon said that the song "came about because, one sunny afternoon in Bermuda, it suddenly hit me what women do for us. Not just what my Yoko does for me, although I was thinking in those personal terms ... but any truth is universal. What dawned on me was everything I was taking for granted. Women really are the other half of the sky, as I whisper at the beginning of the song. It's a 'we' or it ain't anything." In that same interview, Lennon said that "Woman" was his most Beatlesque song on Double Fantasy and that the track is a "grown-up version" of his Beatles song "Girl".

On 5 June 1981, Geffen re-released "Woman" as a single as part of their "Back to Back Hits" series, with the B-side "(Just Like) Starting Over". In the United Kingdom, "Woman" replaced Lennon's 1971 track "Imagine" at number 1.

A promotional film for the song was created by Yoko Ono in January 1981. Throughout most of the video, Lennon and Ono are seen walking through Central Park near what would become Strawberry Fields across from The Dakota. This footage was directed by photographer Ethan Russell on 26 November 1980.  Other footage of Ono alone, along with photos and newspaper coverage of Lennon's murder, were also included.

Reception
Record World described it as a "simple, introspective love song" and said that the power its last line − "I love you now and forever" − magnifies the songs impact.

Ultimate Classic Rock critic Stephen Lewis rated it as Lennon's greatest solo love song.

Chart performance
The single debuted at number three in Lennon's native UK, then moving to number two and finally reaching number one, where it spent two weeks, knocking off the top spot his own re-released "Imagine". In the US the single peaked at number two on the Billboard Hot 100 (kept out of the top spot by REO Speedwagon's hit "Keep On Loving You" and Blondie's hit "Rapture") while reaching number one on the Cashbox Top 100.

Charts

Weekly charts

Year-end charts

All-time charts

Certifications

Personnel
John Lennon – vocals, acoustic guitar
Earl Slick, Hugh McCracken – lead guitar
Tony Levin – bass guitar
George Small – piano, Rhodes piano, Prophet-5 synthesizer
Andy Newmark – drums
Arthur Jenkins – percussion
 Michelle Simpson, Cassandra Wooten, Cheryl Mason Jacks, Eric Troyer – backing vocals

See also
List of posthumous number-one singles (UK)

References

John Lennon songs
1981 singles
Songs written by John Lennon
Cashbox number-one singles
Irish Singles Chart number-one singles
UK Singles Chart number-one singles
Number-one singles in New Zealand
Number-one singles in Zimbabwe
Song recordings produced by Jack Douglas (record producer)
Song recordings produced by John Lennon
Song recordings produced by Yoko Ono
Rock ballads
1980s ballads
Geffen Records singles
1980 songs
Songs released posthumously
Songs with feminist themes
British soft rock songs